Darwin's finches (also known as the Galápagos finches) are a group of about 18 species of passerine birds. They are well known for their remarkable diversity in beak form and function. They are often classified as the subfamily Geospizinae or tribe Geospizini. They belong to the tanager family and are not closely related to the true finches. The closest known relative of the Galápagos finches is the South American dull-coloured grassquit (Asemospiza obscura). They were first collected when the second voyage of the Beagle visited the  Galápagos Islands, with Charles Darwin on board as a gentleman naturalist. Apart from the Cocos finch, which is from Cocos Island, the others are found only on the Galápagos Islands.

The term "Darwin's finches" was first applied by Percy Lowe in 1936, and popularised in 1947 by David Lack in his book Darwin's Finches. Lack based his analysis on the large collection of museum specimens collected by the 1905–06 Galápagos expedition of the California Academy of Sciences, to whom Lack dedicated his 1947 book. The smallest are the warbler-finches and the largest is the vegetarian finch. The most important differences between species are in the size and shape of their beaks, which are highly adapted to different food sources. The birds are all dull-coloured. They are thought to have evolved from a single finch species that came to the islands more than a million years ago.

Darwin's theory 
During the survey voyage of HMS Beagle, Darwin was unaware of the significance of the birds of the Galápagos. He had learned how to preserve bird specimens from John Edmonstone while at the University of Edinburgh and had been keen on shooting, but he had no expertise in ornithology and by this stage of the voyage concentrated mainly on geology. In Galápagos he mostly left bird shooting to his servant Syms Covington. Nonetheless, these birds were to play an important part in the inception of Darwin's theory of evolution by natural selection.

On the Galápagos Islands and afterward, Darwin thought in terms of "centres of creation" and rejected ideas concerning the transmutation of species. From Henslow's teaching, he was interested in the geographical distribution of species, particularly links between species on oceanic islands and on nearby continents. On Chatham Island, he recorded that a mockingbird was similar to those he had seen in Chile, and after finding a different one on Charles Island he carefully noted where mockingbirds had been caught. In contrast, he paid little attention to the finches. When examining his specimens on the way to Tahiti, Darwin noted that all of the mockingbirds on Charles Island were of one species, those from Albemarle of another, and those from James and Chatham Islands of a third. As they sailed home about nine months later, this, together with other facts, including what he had heard about Galápagos tortoises, made him wonder about the stability of species.

Following his return from the voyage Darwin presented the finches to the Zoological Society of London on 4 January 1837, along with other mammal and bird specimens that he had collected. The bird specimens, including the finches, were given to John Gould, the famous English ornithologist, for identification. Gould set aside his paying work and at the next meeting, on 10 January, reported that the birds from the Galápagos Islands that Darwin had thought were blackbirds, "gross-beaks" and finches were actually "a series of ground Finches which are so peculiar [as to form] an entirely new group, containing 12 species." This story made the newspapers.

Darwin had been in Cambridge at that time. In early March, he met Gould again and for the first time to get a full report on the findings, including the point that his Galápagos "wren" was another closely allied species of finch. The mockingbirds that Darwin had labelled by island were separate species rather than just varieties. Gould found more species than Darwin had expected, and concluded that 25 of the 26 land birds were new and distinct forms, found nowhere else in the world but closely allied to those found on the South American continent. Darwin now saw that, if the finch species were confined to individual islands, like the mockingbirds, this would help to account for the number of species on the islands, and he sought information from others on the expedition. Specimens had also been collected by Captain Robert FitzRoy, FitzRoy's steward Harry Fuller, and Darwin's servant Covington, who had labelled them by island. From these, Darwin tried to reconstruct the locations from where he had collected his own specimens. The conclusions supported his idea of the transmutation of species.

Text from The Voyage of the Beagle 
At the time that he rewrote his diary for publication as Journal and Remarks (later The Voyage of the Beagle), he described Gould's findings on the number of birds, noting that "Although the species are thus peculiar to the archipelago, yet nearly all in their general structure, habits, colour of feathers, and even tone of voice, are strictly American". In the first edition of The Voyage of the Beagle, Darwin said thatIt is very remarkable that a nearly perfect gradation of structure in this one group can be traced in the form of the beak, from one exceeding in dimensions that of the largest gros-beak, to another differing but little from that of a warbler".

By the time the first edition was published, the development of Darwin's theory of natural selection was in progress. For the 1845 second edition of The Voyage (now titled Journal of Researches), Darwin added more detail about the beaks of the birds, and two closing sentences which reflected his changed ideas:Seeing this gradation and diversity of structure in one small, intimately related group of birds, one might really fancy that from an original paucity of birds in this archipelago, one species had been taken and modified for different ends."

Text from On the Origin of Species 
Darwin discussed the divergence of species of birds in the Galápagos more explicitly in his chapter on geographical distribution in On the Origin of Species:

Polymorphism in Darwin's finches 
Whereas Darwin spent just five weeks in the Galápagos, and David Lack spent three months, Peter and Rosemary Grant and their colleagues have made research trips to the Galápagos for about 30 years, particularly studying Darwin's finches.

Females are dimorphic in song type: songs A and B are quite distinct. Also, males with song A have shorter bills than B males, another clear difference. With these beaks, males are able to feed differently on their favourite cactus, the prickly pear Opuntia. Those with long beaks are able to punch holes in the cactus fruit and eat the fleshy aril pulp, which surrounds the seeds, whereas those with shorter beaks tear apart the cactus base and eat the pulp and any insect larvae and pupae (both groups eat flowers and buds). This dimorphism clearly maximises their feeding opportunities during the non-breeding season when food is scarce.

If the population is panmixic, then Geospiza conirostris exhibits a balanced genetic polymorphism and not, as originally supposed, a case of nascent sympatric speciation. The selection maintaining the polymorphism maximises the species' niche by expanding its feeding opportunity. The genetics of this situation cannot be clarified in the absence of a detailed breeding program, but two loci with linkage disequilibrium is a possibility.

Another interesting dimorphism is for the bills of young finches, which are either 'pink' or 'yellow'. All species of Darwin's finches exhibit this morphism, which lasts for two months. No interpretation of this phenomenon is known.

Taxonomy

Family 
For some decades, taxonomists have placed these birds in the family Emberizidae along with the New World sparrows and Old World buntings. However, the Sibley–Ahlquist taxonomy puts Darwin's finches with the tanagers (Monroe and Sibley 1993), and at least one recent work follows that example (Burns and Skutch 2003). The American Ornithologists' Union, in its North American checklist, places the Cocos finch in the Emberizidae, but with an asterisk indicating that the placement is probably wrong (AOU 1998–2006); in its tentative South American check-list, the Galápagos species are incertae sedis, of uncertain place (Remsen et al. 2007).

Species 

 Genus Geospiza
 Genovesa ground finch (Geospiza acutirostris)
 Española cactus finch (Geospiza conirostris)
 Sharp-beaked ground finch (Geospiza difficilis)
 Vampire finch (Geospiza septentrionalis)
 Medium ground finch (Geospiza fortis)
 Genovesa cactus finch (Geospiza propinqua)
 Small ground finch (Geospiza fuliginosa)
 Large ground finch (Geospiza magnirostris)
 Common cactus finch (Geospiza scandens)
 Big Bird (not yet formally named): In 1981, a hybrid male arrived at Daphne Major island. Its mating with local Galapagos finches (specifically G. fortis) has produced a new "big bird" population that can exploit previously unexploited food due to its larger size. They do not breed with the other species on the island, as the females do not recognize the songs of the new males. Genetic evidence shows that currently, after several generations (a time scale that suggests shorter speciation events could have occurred previously), it lives in a complete reproductive isolation from the native species. According to professor Leif Andersson of Uppsala University, a taxonomist not aware of its history would consider it a distinct species.
 Genus Camarhynchus
 Large tree finch (Camarhynchus psittacula)
 Medium tree finch (Camarhynchus pauper)
 Small tree finch (Camarhynchus parvulus)
 Woodpecker finch (Camarhynchus pallidus) – sometimes separated in Cactospiza
 Mangrove finch (Camarhynchus heliobates)
 Genus Certhidea
 Green warbler-finch (Certhidea olivacea)
 Grey warbler-finch (Certhidea fusca)
 Genus Pinaroloxias
 Cocos finch (Pinaroloxias inornata)
 Genus Platyspiza
 Vegetarian finch (Platyspiza crassirostris)

Modern research 
A long-term study carried out for more than 40 years by the Princeton University researchers Peter and Rosemary Grant has documented evolutionary changes in beak size affected by El Niño/La Niña cycles in the Pacific.

Molecular basis of beak evolution 
Developmental research in 2004 found that bone morphogenetic protein 4 (BMP4), and its differential expression during development, resulted in variation of beak size and shape among finches. BMP4 acts in the developing embryo to lay down skeletal features, including making the beak stronger. The same group showed that the development of the different beak shapes in Darwin's finches are also influenced by slightly different timing and spatial expressions of a gene called calmodulin (CaM). Calmodulin acts in a similar way to BMP4, affecting some of the features of beak growth like making them long and pointy. The authors suggest that changes in the temporal and spatial expression of these two factors are possible developmental controls of beak morphology. In a recent study genome sequencing revealed a 240 kilobase haplotype encompassing the ALX1 gene that encodes a transcription factor affecting craniofacial development is strongly associated with beak shape diversity. Moreover, these changes in the beak size have also altered vocalizations in Darwin's finches.

See also
Species flock
Adaptive radiation
Island gigantism and island dwarfism

Notes

References

 
 
 
 
 
 
 

 
 
  It is not clear whether this placement was made by Burns and Skutch or by Perrins.
 
 Monroe and Sibley consider the tanagers to be a tribe (Thraupini) of a big family Fringillidae rather than a family of their own (Thraupidae).

Further reading

External links 

 Different bills and song melodies
 Genetics and the Origin of Birds Species, Grant and Grant in PNAS
 Sato et al. Phylogeny of Darwin's finches as revealed by mtDNA sequences in PNAS
 Galápagos Online. Darwin's Finches.
 Galapagos Online. List of birds of the Galapagos Islands.
 Darwin's Finches Evolve Before Scientists' Eyes: new developments reported 13 July 2006
 Fink F.A.Q. Darwin's finches inspired the naming of the Fink project, a collaborative initiative for porting open source software to the Darwin platform to enable its use and evolution in the Apple Mac OS X environment. "Fink" is the German name for "finch."
 Aug 2006 Nature Article that shows how modulation of a certain gene during development can account for the differences seen in beak shape.
 Speciation Kimball's Biology Pages

Finches
Endemic birds of the Galápagos Islands
Evolution of birds
Finches
 
History of evolutionary biology
Polymorphism (biology)
Bird common names